Harry Kenneth Leyland (12 May 1930 – 6 December 2006) was a Liverpool-born footballer who made 36 Football League appearances for Everton before transferring to Blackburn Rovers. He was outstanding in the 1959–60 FA Cup semi-final against Sheffield Wednesday that Rovers won 2–1, but disappointment followed in the final when already one down Rovers lost Dave Whelan with a broken leg and went on to lose 3–0 to Wolverhampton Wanderers. Leyland later played for Tranmere Rovers (playing 180 League games for them) and for the last 25 years of his life he was a very active in the running of New Brighton Rugby Union Football Club and in January 2009 a stand at their ground was named in his honour. He also managed Wigan Athletic.

References

1930 births
2006 deaths
Footballers from Liverpool
English footballers
Association football goalkeepers
Everton F.C. players
Blackburn Rovers F.C. players
Tranmere Rovers F.C. players
English Football League players
Wigan Athletic F.C. managers
English football managers
FA Cup Final players